KMRL may refer to:

 Kochi Metro Rail Limited, an Indian railway company
 KMRL (FM), a radio station (91.9 FM) licensed to serve Buras, Louisiana, United States